‘Abdullah Mirza (after 1410 – June 1451) was a short-lived ruler of the Timurid Empire, which encompassed the territory shared by present-day Iran, Afghanistan, Pakistan, along with substantial areas of India, Mesopotamia and Caucasus.

As a member of the Timurid dynasty, Abdullah Mirza was a great-grandson of Timur, a grandson of Shah Rukh and a son of Ibrahim Sultan. Granted the governorship of Fars by his grandfather, Abdullah Mirza found his position threatened by his cousin Sultan Muhammad during the 1447 succession crisis which followed Shah Rukh's death, and was forced to abandon the province. As a supporter of Ulugh Beg, he was imprisoned by 'Abd al-Latif following the latter's rise to power. When 'Abd al-Latif was murdered, he was released and made ruler of Samarkand, for which he was forced to lavish money upon the troops that supported him. Despite this, he did not enjoy widespread popularity.

During his relatively brief reign, a revolt created by Sultan Muhammad's brother Ala al-Dawla Mirza did not seriously threaten him, but a rising initiated by Abu Sa'id Mirza, whose home base, at the time, was in Bukhara, proved to be fatal. Marching from Tashkent to Samarkand with the support of Abu'l-Khayr Khan, Abu Sa'id Mirza defeated Abdullah Mirza and executed him in 1451, taking his place on the throne.

References
Roemer, H. R. (1986). "The Successors of Timur". The Cambridge History of Iran, Volume 6: The Timurid and Safavid Periods. Ed. Peter Jackson. New York, New York: Cambridge University Press. 

Timurid monarchs
Timurid civil wars
Executed royalty
People from Fars Province
15th-century births
1451 deaths
15th-century executions
Year of birth unknown
Place of birth unknown
Date of death unknown